Monteagle "Monty" Stearns (December 5, 1924 – May 14, 2016) was an American diplomat and author. He served as Ambassador to Côte d'Ivoire (Ivory Coast; 1976–79) and Greece (1981–85).

Born in Cambridge, Massachusetts, he attended Columbia University in 1948 and graduated with his B.A. He was a member of  the American Academy of Diplomacy and Council on Foreign Relations. He was married to Antonia Riddleberger and had 6 children. He was the son-in-law of James W. Riddleberger.

Stearns grew up in Carmel, California and in New England. In 1943, while at Stanford, he enlisted in the Marine Corps, completed Officer Candidate School and was assigned to the U.S.S. West Virginia. Following WWII, he graduated from the College with a degree in English. A Foreign Service officer for more than 40 years, he served in Turkey, the Congo, the UK, Laos, as U.S. Ambassador to the Ivory Coast, and three tours in Greece, the last also as ambassador.

Honors
In 2014, he was made Grand Commander of the Order of the Phoenix by the president of the Hellenic Republic.

Death
Stearns died on May 14, 2016, aged 91, in Belmont, Massachusetts. He was survived by his wife of 57 years, Antonia Stearns (née Riddleberger); a sister (Mrs. Mary Lou Roppoli), six children, and eight grandchildren.

Books

References

1924 births
2016 deaths
Ambassadors of the United States to Greece
Ambassadors of the United States to Ivory Coast
People from Cambridge, Massachusetts
Columbia College (New York) alumni
Writers from Massachusetts